Adolf Hausrath (13 January 18372 August 1909), a German theologian, was born at Karlsruhe.

Biography
He was educated at Jena, Göttingen, Berlin and Heidelberg, where he became Privatdozent in 1861, professor extraordinary in 1867 and ordinary professor in 1872. He was a disciple of the Tübingen school and a strong Protestant.  His scholarship was sound and his style vigorous.

Hausrath died on 3 August 1909 in Heidelberg.

Works
Among other works he wrote Der Apostel Paulus (1865), Neutestamentliche Zeitgeschichte (1868–1873, 4 vols; Eng. trans.), D. F. Strauss und die Theologie seiner Zeit (1876-1878, 2 vols), and lives of Richard Rothe (2 vols, 1902), and Luther (1904).

Under the pseudonym George Taylor he wrote several historical romances, especially Antinous (1880), which quickly ran through five editions, and is the story of a soul "which courted death because the objective restraints of faith had been lost." Klytia (1883) was a 16th-century story, Samen (1884) a fictional work of 19th century Germany, Jetta (1885) a tale of the great immigrations, and Elfriede "a romance of the Rhine".

Notes

References

External links
 
 

19th-century German Protestant theologians
Academic staff of Heidelberg University
Writers from Karlsruhe
1837 births
1909 deaths
German male non-fiction writers
19th-century male writers